Robert Lyndel Lewis (born March 17, 1976) is an American music arranger, music composer, record producer, musical director, film composer, musician, entrepreneur, and impresario. In his 20-plus years in the music industry, Lewis has worked on several Grammy Award winning singles and albums, and his production, songs, and arrangements have been featured on #1 albums, gold and platinum albums, films, live productions, and television shows.

His studio experience include works with Babyface, Rascal Flatts, Mary J. Blige, Dr. Dre, Christina Aguilera, Diddy, and many more. Lewis participated in three seasons as an on-air personality and musical director for the morning show Big Morning Buzz Live with host Nick Lachey on VH1, and has been featured on the reality TV shows Wahlburgers, Donnie Loves Jenny and Braxton Family Values, and had a recurring role as music producer on the syndicated daytime talk show Steve.

In 2018, Lewis arranged, scored, and remained musical director for Christina Aguilera's sold-out Liberation Tour, played musical sidekick on the hit WNYC podcast "Late Night Whenever" with Michelle Buteau, which Time Magazine dubbed as one of the "Best Podcasts of 2018", was a featured musician and composer in the Netflix original special "Bumping Mics" with Jeff Ross and Dave Attell, and arranged Christina Aguilera's performance for Dick Clark's "New Year's Rockin' Eve" which was viewed by more than eight million people. Lewis is also a co-writer of Anderson Paak's first single Tints, featuring Kendrick Lamar, from his album Oxnard, produced by Om'Mas Keith and Dr. Dre.
Most recently, Lewis served as the music supervisor and principal arranger for Christina Aguilera's Vegas residency show The Xperience which debuted in May, 2019. As late as Jan. 2020, Lewis served as on-air personality and music director for the new Nickelodeon music competition show America's Most Musical Family and worked with the contestants to enhance their weekly performances as they advanced in the competition.

During the pandemic, Lewis founded 19 in the 4th Creative Collective, making the decision to focus on developing talent and launching new music and visual projects, live performance platforms, and more.

Early life
Lewis was born on the south side of Chicago, the youngest child of Anna Lewis, a school teacher, and Robert Samuel Lewis (both deceased). Wanting a life better for her son, Anna enforced education early on. Lewis' mother put him in piano lessons at 5 years of age with acclaimed pianist Tom Stevens. Until 9, Lewis began learning the techniques of reading music and of the piano, although he didn't favor classical music. Later in life, Lewis would acknowledge that his objection to classical music at that age was probably because "it had rules, with very little freedom to express anything different". Upon arriving to Mr. Stevens' home early one week, Lewis heard Mr. Stevens practicing a different style of piano, and when he went upstairs for his lesson, he asked Mr. Stevens to show him what he had been playing. This was Lewis' first discovery of jazz, and where Lewis found a love for the piano. So Lewis' mother extended his lesson time from one half-hour to an hour: a half-hour on classical, and half on jazz.

Lewis' mother was heavily involved in church. Lewis, his mother, and his sister, Samantha (deceased), began attending Christ Way Baptist Church under the strict guidance of Rev. Consuella York (who was the first African-American woman to be ordained a Baptist minister in Chicago, and was also the first female chaplain of the Cook County Jail.) Lewis played for all of the services during the week, guided by York's son and Minister of Music, Thomas Alvin Keel, and often played solos. Because Lewis' mother taught school on the north side of the city, she would drop Lewis off at the church early in the morning, and Lewis would stay there until it was time for school, everyday practicing on the church's Steinway and Sons grand piano. At age 10, Lewis then transferred to the Allen Studio Of Music, under the training of Mrs. Lorraine Allen and her son, Ernie Allen, Jr., who was a masterful Hammond organ player. Lewis learned how to play the Hammond organ, although his legs weren't quite long enough to reach the pedals, and by age 12, was teaching at the school. Lewis was looked at as a child prodigy, simply because of how he applied his classical techniques on the Hammond Organ, and because he was teaching choirs at such a young age.

For years, a young Lewis made money as a musician, whether playing for various churches, or for weddings and funerals. He attended the De La Salle Institute for high school, and was the first to get a scholarship for music to the school, because he played for all of the liturgical services at the school. Lewis was involved with the school band as a drummer, and won numerous awards for his talents and 1st place in jazz band competitions around the city. It was Lewis' high school band teacher, Larry Pawlowski, that told Lewis that he had the skills to pursue a career in music, and encouraged Lewis to leave Chicago and apply for Berklee College of Music in Boston, Ma.. Lewis was voted "Most likely to become famous" by his peers in the Senior yearbook.

Musical career
Lewis left Chicago in August 1993, and went to be educated at the Berklee College of Music in Boston, with a dual major in Music Production and Engineering and Music Business. But after 2 years, because of the financial strain, Rob was forced to drop out of school. Lewis got his ‘big break’ in 1995 when Brian McKnight, whom Lewis met when he was at Berklee, decided to take him on the road for his tour. Lewis' first encounter with McKnight was when his teacher, jazz saxophonist Walter Beasley brought McKnight to Berklee for a clinic in 1993. Almost two years later, after impressing McKnight's musical director, guitarist Jeff Lockhart, a young Lewis was given the opportunity to go on tour with McKnight.  Rob worked with McKnight as his keyboardist for years, and also under McKnight in the studio, and later as his musical director. Under McKnight, Lewis learned the art of writing, producing, and arranging. McKnight's influence on Lewis' music is strong, and Lewis acknowledges his time under Brian McKnight as the most influential in his musical journey, because of his admiration of McKnight's writing style, arranging, and vocal production on his own records.

Rob Lewis is one of the premier names in the music industry for musical direction. Lewis is sought after for his arranging skill, his attention to detail, and his unique style of interaction with musicians. He was longtime musical director for global powerhouse superstar Christina Aguilera (20 yrs), and served as longtime arranger and musical director for New Kids On The Block (10 yrs), Toni Braxton (13 yrs), and has produced the music content and toured with global artists Backstreet Boys, TLC, Boyz II Men, 98 Degrees, has sustained a career as a musical director for more than two decades for pop stars Fifth Harmony, also for The Pussycat Dolls, Leona Lewis, and Jessica Simpson, as well as R&B stars Brian McKnight, Eric Benet, Deborah Cox, and Fantasia, and iconic legends Patti LaBelle, and Babyface. Lewis recognizes musical director Rickey Minor as a mentor whose referral and direct tutelage provided many opportunities for Lewis to grow as a musical director.

Lewis has produced, written songs, and arranged on several #1 albums including Christina Aguilera's Back to Basics, Diddy's Press Play, Fall Out Boy's Infinity on High, Jamie Foxx's Unpredictable, Herbie Hancock's "Possibilities", Heather Headley's Grammy Award winning "Audience of One", and Vanessa L. Williams' "The Real Thing".  Lewis' emotional string and horn arranging has gotten him notoriety for his work on Fall Out Boy's single "Thnks fr th Mmrs.", Christina Aguilera's "Oh Mother"  and "Understand", Jamie Foxx's "Heaven", Chrisette Michele's "Best of Me" and "Your Joy" (which Lewis also co-wrote with Babyface and Chrisette Michele).

Lewis worked with superstar Toni Braxton on several tours, and was responsible for putting the music production together for Toni Braxton's "Revealed" Flamingo Hotel show in Las Vegas, which ran for two years. He is well known in the gospel genre for his early writing and production with the group Here II Praise, who was signed by gospel legend Daryl Coley and Jenell Alexander Coley through a deal with Verity Records. With their harmonic and artistic capabilities, their album "Giving You Nothing But Praise" debuted on Billboard's Gospel charts in the Top 20 in Sept. 1998, The choir, led by Lewis, won the "Bobby Jones Excellence Award" for "Best Urban Contemporary Choir of the year" at the Gospel Music Workshop of America (GMWA)  in 1998, and was nominated for a Stellar Award in 1999. Lewis is a self-taught string arranger, and Grammy Award winning gospel producer Donald Lawrence employed his arranging talents for several projects in the late 1990s including Lawrence's Christmas album "Hello Christmas", and for Bishop TD Jakes "Sacred Love Songs", A few years later, Lawrence introduced innovative singer and producer Tonex to Lewis to do arranging for Tonex's O2 album ("The Beautiful Place" and "Even You"). Along with arranging, he is also known for his scores and songs with film maker/playwright and NAACP Image Award winner David E. Talbert, who assigned him the moniker "Young Q", referring to Lewis as a "young Quincy Jones" (who Lewis always refers to as the "greatest musical role model" because of Jones' incredible wide range of abilities to arrange, compose, and produce music.) Lewis has written the scores for Talbert's theatrical plays "Love Makes Things Happen" featuring the music of Babyface, "The Fabric Of A Man", "He Say She Say, But What Does God Say", and Lewis wrote the original songs and score for "Love On Layaway" starring Deborah Cox and Cassie Davis. For Talbert's feature film "First Sunday", starring Ice Cube and Tracy Morgan, Lewis wrote and produced the song "Live Again" which played during the end credits.

Rob Lewis served as a LA Chapter Governor for The Recording Academy, where he worked hard with the Academy to create opportunities to educate up and coming music professionals, and to make a difference in the ailing music industry. As a part of The Recording Academy, Rob Lewis was a part of special events and panels and conducted workshops for Grammy Career Day, Grammy Soundchecks, and Grammy U.

Lewis' main focus is his company, Details Music Management, a multimedia company that creates and produces music content for live shows, television, and films. Recently, Lewis' work was a major part of the success of the 45-city arena tour Total Package Tour with New Kids On The Block, Paula Abdul, and Boyz II Men. Lewis also puts focus towards the management of touring musicians and artists. Lewis started his philanthropic venture "The Dreamers Movement" six years ago and annually runs a coat drive in New York City providing coats for boys and girls shelters with the help of his supporters and friends.

In 2012, Rob Lewis released his debut album "The Masterpiece", which features Lewis as an arranger, songwriter, singer, and musician. The album, solely produced by Lewis, took five years to finish, but has extensive arranging of string orchestras, horns, and live instruments. Lewis considers the album to be "his greatest work" because of the time spent on finishing it, but also because it is described as a "collage of influences and the result of his time with all of the celebrated musicians and artists that he has worked with". The album has 11 songs, and ranges from soul music, urban contemporary R&B, to jazz and inspirational.

Work with Christina Aguilera
Lewis began touring with Christina Aguilera in 2002, following the release of her second album "Stripped". Lewis was Aguilera's co-musical director, under Rickey Minor, and traveled as her musical director during the co-headlining "Justified/Stripped Tour" with Justin Timberlake in 2003. In 2004, Lewis was contracted by Aguilera to arrange her Grammy performance of "Beautiful", which featured a 21-piece string orchestra, the Roger Wagner Chorale, and her band. That night, "Beautiful" earned Aguilera the Grammy for "Best Female Pop Vocal Performance".

In addition, Lewis was very involved in Aguilera's 2006 Back to Basics album as a vocal arranger and producer, string arranger, horn arranger, and was a co-writer on "Without You" (co-written by Christina Aguilera, Kara DioGuardi, and Mark Ronson), Lewis also traveled and collaborated with Aguilera as her musical director and arranger on her 2006-07 Back to Basics Tour and the tour DVD, "Back to Basics: Live and Down Under", and has also served as her vocal producer on numerous occasions and on records including "Tell Me", the lead single from Diddy's 2006 "Press Play" album. Lewis' vocal production work with Aguilera helped to earn a Grammy nomination in 2006 for Herbie Hancock's album Possibilities (Best Pop Collaboration with Vocals, for "A Song for You") and Lewis was a vocal producer for Aguilera's hit "Ain't No Other Man", which won a 2007 Grammy Award for "Best Pop Performance".

In 2012, Lewis received vocal production and co-writing credits on her album "Lotus" (Sing For Me), and he remains her pianist, arranger, and musical director for all of her live performances today. Additionally, he arranged Aguilera’s 2015 NBA All-Star game New York-inspired opening performance.

Lewis also served as the musical director for Aguilera’s critically acclaimed first tour in a decade in 2018, Liberation Tour in support of her sixth album, Liberation, and for her Vegas residency The Xperience.

Work with Babyface
Lewis worked closely with Kenny "Babyface" Edmonds,  as a writer, string arranger, producer, and musical director, and started touring with Edmonds in 2005. Edmonds used Lewis' skills as an arranger on albums with Jamie Foxx ("Heaven"), Fall Out Boy ("Thnks Fr Th Mrms"), and made him an integral part of his covers album Playlist,  and is featured on Edmonds' "Grown and Sexy" DVD.  While in Boston for a performance with Edmonds, Lewis took Edmonds to Berklee College of Music to talk with some students, and while there, surprised Edmonds with the creation of a new master songwriting class at Berklee College of Music titled "The Music of Kenny "Babyface" Edmonds", in homage to Babyface’s work in the music industry. Together Lewis and Babyface have written and arranged songs including "Your Joy" with Chrisette Michele for her debut album "I Am", and "Loving You" for Vanessa L. Williams' 2009 album "The Real Thing". Lewis considers Babyface to be one of the greatest influences in his career as a writer and producer, and considers his time under Edmonds as "the greatest school ever".

Work with Diddy
In 2006, Christina Aguilera brought Lewis into the studio to work with her to arrange and produce the vocals for music mogul Diddy's lead single "Tell Me".  While working on the song, Diddy noticed Lewis' work ethic and style when producing vocals and had such a regard for Lewis' skills as a vocal producer and arranger, he told Lewis that he was going to put him "on TV". Shrugging the notion off Lewis didn't give it much thought, until he received a call from MTV stating that Diddy wanted him to be a part of the series "Making The Band".  As a vocal coach and producer, Lewis was featured on MTV's "Making the Band", Season 3 with Diddy and pop girl group Danity Kane. Diddy also enlisted Lewis to work on most of his album, where Lewis did vocal production for "Come to Me" working with Nicole Scherzinger, "Tell Me", working with Christina Aguilera, "Making It Hard" working with Mary J. Blige, string arranging for "Thought You Said" featuring Brandy, and co-wrote two songs with Diddy, "Crazy Thang" and "Claim My Place". In 2009, Rob Lewis was commissioned by Diddy once again to be on MTV's television series "Making His Band" where Lewis used his musical directing skills to assist Diddy in finding young, up and coming artists to create Diddy's new band for his forthcoming tour.

Work with New Kids On The Block/Backstreet Boys/Boyz II Men/98 Degrees/TLC
In 2008, Lewis was enlisted as musical director for New Kids On The Block's highly anticipated reunion tour. Working closely with Donnie Wahlberg, Lewis has been musical director and arranged the music for the last five tours, and they continue to work together on tours and television projects. Wahlberg has featured Lewis on his reality shows Wahlburgers and Donnie Loves Jenny. Lewis was the musical director/arranger for the highly successful mashup 2011-2012 World Tour for New Kids On The Block and the Backstreet Boys (NKOTBSB), and also for the NKOTB's 2013 sold out arena tour "The Package" with Boyz II Men and 98 Degrees, where Lewis served as musical director and arranger for all three acts. In 2015, Lewis served as musical director for "The Main Event" tour with New Kids On The Block featuring TLC and Nelly. In 2017, Lewis was commissioned to create the musical arrangements for the Total Package Tour, with New Kids On The Block, Paula Abdul, and Boyz II Men.

Work on VH1's Big Morning Buzz Live with host Nick Lachey
Lewis was an on-air personality, dubbed the "One Man House Band", for the last three seasons of the VH1 television show Big Morning Buzz Live, when 98 Degrees frontman Nick Lachey became the host. The morning show aired on VH1 five days a week and featured celebrity guest interviews, live music performances, and musical skits. Brought in by longtime friend and television director Rik Reinholtsen, Lewis was introduced to the show's executive producer- four-time Emmy-award winning television producer Shane Farley.

Lewis' original role on the show was to appear once a week in a segment called the "Remix Rewind"- a segment where Lachey and Lewis would perform a song that would chronicle the highlights of the week, always co-written with producer Devin Delliquanti (The Daily Show). Farley expanded Lewis' role on the show as the seasons continued, making Lewis an everyday on-camera personality, utilizing his arranging and musicianship for the musical skits and bumpers, conducting interviews, and even gave Lewis a reoccurring segment called "Rob Lewis Presents", where Lewis was able to highlight his own alliance of singers and performers. The show was cancelled in 2015.

Philanthropy
In 2009, through an entity created by Rob Lewis- "The Dreamers Movement", fans were instrumental in helping to provide new pots and pans, clothing, and financial contributions to the Create Young Adult Boys Shelter in New York, and for Christmas, Lewis orchestrated a coat drive for the Turning Point Young Women Shelter in Brooklyn, NY. All residents at the shelter received brand new coats and accessories for Christmas from all over the world, through generous donations and support from NKOTB fans, affectionately known as "Blockheads". 2014 marked the sixth consecutive year for The Dreamer's Movement's coat drive. Lewis' current dream effort is working to build his own music education facility in New York, "MISOMA" (The Movement Institute, School of Musical Advancement), a facility where music education and the arts are brought to the inner city, and where young kids and young adults can learn and experience the arts without cost. "The Dreamers Movement", is dedicated to providing awareness, care, and help to the less fortunate, using music and the patronage of his supporters to give hope and inspire the lives of homeless young adults. While on the road with various artists, Rob Lewis creates live jam sessions, in which he raises money and sponsors shelters and food banks in selected cities.

Awards
In September 2007, Lewis was awarded the "Distinguished Alumni Award" from Berklee College of Music in recognition of his career accomplishments.

Discography
As Producer/arranger:

 Jaheim- "Appreciation Day" (2013)
 Rob Lewis- "The Masterpiece" (2012)
 Naughty By Nature- "Anthem Inc." (2012)
 Rob Lewis- "Brokenhearted" (single) (2009)
 Vanessa Williams- "The Real Thing" (2009) Billboard Top Contemporary Jazz Albums #1
 Heather Headley- "Audience of One" (2009) Billboard Gospel Charts #1
 Kenny "Babyface" Edmonds- "Playlist" (2007) Billboard R&B/Hip Hop Charts #7
 Fall Out Boy- "Infinity On High" (2007) Billboard Top 200 #1
 Jamie Foxx- "Unpredictable" (2007) Billboard Top 200 #1
 Chrisette Michele- "I Am" (2007) Billboard Top R&B/Hip-Hop Albums #5
 Christina Aguilera- "Back to Basics" (2006) Billboard Top 200 #1
 Diddy- "Press Play" (2006) Billboard Top 200 #1
 Herbie Hancock- "Possibilities" (2006) Billboard Top Contemporary Jazz #1
 Here II Praise- "Giving You Nothing But Praise" (1998) Billboard Gospel Charts #20
 Myron- "Destiny" (1998) Billboard R&B/Hip Hop Charts #38
 Donald Lawrence- "Hello Christmas" (1997) Billboard Gospel Charts #7
 Bishop TD Jakes- "Sacred Love Songs" (1997)

As Songwriter:

 Anderson Paak- "Tints" featuring Kendrick Lamar
 Yuna- "Nocturnal" ("Call Everyone", co-written and produced by OmMas Keith)
 Jaheim- "Appreciation Day" (Sexting) (2013)
 Rob Lewis- "The Masterpiece" (entire album) (2012)
 Naughty By Nature- "Anthem Inc." ("Perfect Party", "Doozit")
 Rob Lewis- "Brokenhearted" (single) (2009)
 Vanessa Williams- "The Real Thing" ("Loving You", co-written with Babyface and Carole Bayer Sager) (2009)
 Christina Aguilera- "Back to Basics" ("Without You", co-written with Christina Aguilera, Kara DioGuardi, and Mark Ronson)  (2006)
 Chrisette Michele- "I Am" ("Your Joy", co-written with Chrisette Michele and Babyface) (2007)
 Diddy- "Press Play" ("Claim My Place" and "Crazy Thang", co-written with Sean "Diddy" Combs) (2006)
 Here II Praise- "Giving You Nothing But Praise" (1998)

As Vocal arranger/vocal producer:

 Christina Aguilera- "Lotus" (Sing For Me))
 Christina Aguilera- "Back to Basics": Disc One, including "Ain't No Other Man" (Grammy Award winner), "Without You", "Back In The Day", "Oh Mother", "On Our Way" and more
 Herbie Hancock-"A Song For You" (Grammy nominated)
 Diddy- "Press Play"
 "Tell Me" featuring Christina Aguilera
 "Come To Me" featuring Nicole Scherzinger
 "Making It Hard" featuring Mary J. Blige
 50 Cent- "Curtis"
 "Fire" featuring Nicole Scherzinger
 Here II Praise- "Giving You Nothing But Praise": Entire Disc

As performer:

 Anderson Paak- "Tints" featuring Kendrick Lamar (piano)
 Christina Aguilera- "Back to Basics" (bass, guitar)
 Kenny "Babyface" Edmonds- "Playlist" (keys)
 Vanessa Williams- "The Real Thing" (piano)
 Jamie Foxx- "Unpredictable" (piano)
 Chrisette Michele- "I Am" (piano)
 Brian McKnight- "Bethlehem" (Hammond Organ)
 Patti LaBelle- "Classic Moments" (vocals)
 Donald Lawrence- "Hello Christmas" (piano)

Tours:

 Brian McKnight (1995–2000): "Brian McKnight" Tour ('95-'96), "Anytime" Tour ('97-'98), "Back At One" World Tour (2000)
 Jessica Simpson (2001): "Dream Chaser" Tour
 Patti LaBelle (2002–2005)
 Christina Aguilera (2002–present): "Justified/Stripped Tour" Tour (2003), "The Stripped Tour" World Tour (2003), "Back to Basics Tour" World Tour (2006 - 2008), "Liberation Tour" (2018) 
 Babyface (2005–2008): "Grown and Sexy" World Tour, "Playlist" World Tour
 New Kids On The Block (2008–2010) "The Block" World Tour
 NKOTBSB (2011-2012) World Tour
 New Kids On The Block (2013) Package Tour with Boyz II Men and 98 Degrees
 New Kids On The Block (2015) The Main Event Tour with TLC and Nelly
 New Kids On The Block (2017) Total Package Tour with Boyz II Men and Paula Abdul
 Christina Aguilera (2018) Liberation Tour with Big Boi
 Toni Braxton (2019) "Long As I Live" Tour with SWV

DVDs:

 Jessica Simpson: "Dream Chaser" (2001)
 Christina Aguilera: "Stripped Live in the U.K." (2003), "Back to Basics: Live and Down Under" (2007):
 Babyface: "Grown and Sexy" (2005)
 New Kids On The Block: "Coming Home" (2009)

As a TV personality:
 VH1 Big Morning Buzz Live with host Nick Lachey
 A&E Donnie Loves Jenny with Donnie Wahlberg
 A&E Wahlburgers with Donnie Wahlberg
 WeTV Braxton Family Values with Toni Braxton
 MTV and Diddy presents "Making The Band", Season 3 (with Danity Kane) (2006)
 MTV and Diddy presents "Making The Band", entire season (2009)

As composer/film composer:
 "First Sunday", starring Ice Cube, Tracy Morgan, and Katt Williams
End credits song: "Live Again" featuring Sasha Allen and Mike Davis
Written and Produced by Rob Lewis
 "The Seat Filler", starring Kelly Rowland and Duane Martin
The score composed by Rob Lewis
Soundtrack written and produced by Rob Lewis, including:
 "Follow Your Destiny" featuring Kelly Rowland
 "Lost Without You" featuring  Chante Moore
 "I Need A Love", featuring Kelly Rowland

Theatrical work:
With David E. Talbert:
 "Love Makes Things Happen", starring Dawn Robinson and Kevon Edmonds
Featuring the music of Babyface, co-produced by Babyface and Tracey Edmonds
Arranged and scored by Rob Lewis
 "Love On Lay-a-way", starring Deborah Cox and Mel Jackson
Music score and original songs written and produced by Rob Lewis
 "He Say, She Say...But What Does God Say", starring Clifton Powell, N'Bushe Wright, and DJ Rogers, Jr.
Score written and arranged by Rob Lewis
 "The Fabric Of A Man", starring Darren DeWitt Henson
Score written and arranged by Rob Lewis

References

1976 births
Living people
American male composers
21st-century American composers
American music arrangers
Record producers from Illinois
21st-century American male musicians